This is an incomplete list of works by the French modern artist Jean Metzinger (June 24, 1883 – November 3, 1956). He is admired as a painter, theorist, writer, critic, and poet. Between 1902 and 1907, Metzinger worked in a combination of Neo-Impressionist, Divisionist and Fauvist styles. A Cézannian component in his work during this phase produced some of the earliest proto-Cubist works.

In the words of S.E. Johnson, an in-depth analysis of Metzinger's Pre-Cubist period—his first artistic peak—"can only class that painter, in spite of his youth, as being already one of the leading artistic personalities in that period directly preceding Cubism. [...] In an attempt to understand the importance of Jean Metzinger in Modern Art, we could limit ourselves to three considerations. Firstly, there is the often overlooked importance of Metzinger's Divisionist Period of 1900–1908. Secondly, there is the role of Metzinger in the founding of the Cubist School. Thirdly, there is the consideration of Metzinger's whole Cubist Period from 1909 to 1930. In taking into account these various factors, we can understand why Metzinger must be included among that small group of artists who have taken a part in the shaping of Art History in the first half of the Twentieth Century."

From 1908, Metzinger experimented with the faceting of form, a style that would soon become known as Cubism. His involvement in Cubism saw him both as an influential artist and principal theorist of the movement.

Metzinger, a sensitive and intelligent theoretician of Cubism, sought to communicate the principles of this movement through his paintings as well as his writings.

Many exhibitions document the painter's national and international success. His works can be found in private and public collections and institutions around the world.

The artist died in Paris on November 3, 1956.

Paintings

Published writings
Jean Metzinger was a highly prolific painter. He was also a published writer and theorist, not only on the topic of Cubism (for which he was the first with Note sur la peinture, 1910), but on the arts in general, on other artists, such as Henri Le Fauconnier, Robert Delaunay, Pablo Picasso, Georges Braque, Albert Gleizes and Alexandre Mercereau. His writings are infused with references to science, mathematics, philosophy, politics, and culture. He was also a published poet. He left behind a number of personal letters and journal entries. The following incomplete list contains some of his important published works.

 Note sur la peinture, Pan (Paris), October–November 1910
 Cubisme et tradition, Paris Journal, 16 August 1911
 Alexandre Mercereau, Vers et prose 27 (October–November 1911): 122-129
 Du "Cubisme", written with Albert Gleizes, Edition Figuière, Paris, 1912 (First English edition: Cubism, Unwin, London, 1913)
 Art et esthétique, Lettres Parisiennes, suppl. 9 (April 1920): 6-7
 Réponse à notre enquête - Où va la peinture moderne?, written with Fernand Léger, Bulletin de l'Effort moderne, February 1924, 5-6
 L'Evolution du coloris, Bulletin de l'Effort moderne, Paris, 1925
 Enquête du bulletin, Bulletin de l'Effort moderne, October 1925, 14-15
 Metzinger, Chabaud, Chagall, Gruber et André Mouchard répondent à l'enquête des Beaux-Arts sur le métric, Beaux-Arts, 2 October 1936, 1
 Un souper chez G. Apollinaire, Apollinaire, Paris, 1946
 Ecluses, Preface par Henri Charpentier, Paris: G.L. Arlaud, 1947
 1912-1946, Afterword to reprint of Du "Cubisme" by A. Gleizes and J. Metzinger, pp. 75–79, Paris, Compagnie française des Arts Graphiques, 1947
 Le Cubisme apporta à Gleizes le moyen d'écrire l'espace, Arts spectacles, no. 418, 3–9, July 1953
 Structures de peinture, Structure de l'esprit, Hommage à Albert Gleizes, with essays, statements and fragments of works by Gleizes, Metzinger, André Beaudin, Gino Severini, et al., Lyons, Atelier de la Rose, 1954
 Suzanne Phocas, Paris, Galerie de l'Institut, February 1955
 Le Cubisme était né, Souvenirs, Chambéry, Editions Présence, 1972

Notes and references

External links

 01
.Metzinger
Metzinger